Horace Biggin (27 May 1897–1984) was an English footballer who played in the Football League for West Ham United.

References

1897 births
1984 deaths
English footballers
Association football forwards
English Football League players
West Ham United F.C. players
Ilkeston United F.C. players
Shirebrook Miners Welfare F.C. players
Retford Town F.C. players
Mansfield Town F.C. players